The Red Mountain Wilderness is a  wilderness area in southwestern White Pine County and northeastern Nye County, within the White Pine Range in the U.S. state of Nevada. The Wilderness lies within the Humboldt-Toiyabe National Forest, administered by the U.S. Forest Service.

Bordered by Currant Mountain Wilderness on the west, the Red Mountain Wilderness and White Pine Range Wilderness was created by the "White Pine County Conservation, Recreation and Development Act of 2006."  It is characterized by volcanic red-orange hills and mountains covered with pinyon pine, limber pine, and bristlecone pine.

See also
Nevada Wilderness Areas
List of wilderness areas in Nevada
List of U.S. Wilderness Areas
Wilderness Act

References

External links
 Humboldt-Toiyabe National Forest: official Red Mountain Wilderness website
 Red Mountain Wilderness at Wildernss.net
 National Atlas: Map of Humboldt-Toiyabe National Forest
 Friends of Nevada Wilderness
Wilderness Society: "Scientists Voice Their Overwhelming Support for Wilderness Designations in White Pine County, Nevada"

Humboldt–Toiyabe National Forest
Wilderness areas of Nevada
Protected areas of Nye County, Nevada
Protected areas of White Pine County, Nevada
IUCN Category Ib
Protected areas established in 2006
2006 establishments in Nevada